The Pandyan Civil War from 1166 to 1182 was precipitated by rival claims of succession to the Pandyan throne. The Civil War began between Parakrama Pandyan and his nephew Kulasekhara Pandyan and lasted for next 15 years between successive Pandyan kings.   The war gradually spread to the rest of Southern India when the Chola King Rajadhiraja II and the Sinhalese King Parakramabahu I of Polonnaruwa entered the fray and took opposing sides in the conflict, eager to increase their influence in the Pandya kingdom.

In about 1169, Kulasekhara besieged Madurai, forcing the Pandyan king Parakrama I to appeal to the Sinhalese King Parakramabahu I for assistance. But before Parakramabahu I's army could reach Madurai, Parakrama I had been executed and Kulasekhara Pandyan had ascended the throne. However Parakrama's son, Vira Pandyan III, sided with the Polonnaruwa forces led by General Lankapura Dandanatha. The Polonnaruwa Army invaded the Pandyan kingdom and Kulasekhara pandyan was forced into exile.

Events

Prior to the war

Images of various gateway towers in the templeIn 1169 Kulasekhara Pandyan, a rival claimant of the Pandyan throne, besieged the Pandyan capital at Madurai. Pandyan king, Parakrama Pandyan I, had to call for military support from the King of Polonnaruwa, Parakramabahu I. By the time the Polonnaruwa Army was assembled for an invasion, it was too late.  Parakrama Pandyan's position was overrun and Kulasekhara had ascended the throne as Kulasekhara Pandyan I. Parakramabahu I instructed his general Lankapura Dandanatha to invade Pandya and besiege Madurai, thus overthrowing Kulasekhara.

Sinhalese offensive

The offensive began in 1171 or 1172; the Sinhalese Army and other units of Polonnaruwa led by Lankapura launched the attack on Ramesvaram. After sailing around the Palk strait for a day, Lankapura landed at Ramesvaram with the Polonnaruwa forces. However, he plundered the Rameshvaram temple's treasury prior to taking position; afterwards they took up defensive positions in a nearby place called Kundukala, Lankapura named this place as Parakramapura (in Pali. meaning: the Land of Parakrama). Lankapura received a message from Vira III, the surviving son of Parakrama Pandyan; after being aware that he is alive, Lankapura allied with him. Prisoners of Lankapura were either killed or enslaved; a large amount of Tamils were sent to repair the Ruwanwelisaya, which was damaged by the Cholas prior to the war.

Lankapura defeated the chieftains who were apparently loyal to Kulasekhara, at Madamdura; and later took possession of Patapatha, defeating its chieftains.

Kulasekhara Pandya put up a fierce resistance against the invasion, and appealed to the Chola King Rajadhiraja II for military support. Rajadhiraja responded by sending a powerful force led by commander Pallavarayar. The Chola Army met the Polonnaruwa forces in a couple of pitched battles at Kilenilaya (identified with the modern-day Kilnilai) and Ponnamaravathi.In addition to the Cholas, Kulasekhara appealed to some Kongu chieftains, who helped him mobilize his forces. The army led by Lankapura advanced to Madurai crushing the defenses deployed by the Chola army. Kulasekhara fled Madurai in panic as Vira Pandya was installed on the throne. Lankapura now took the battle into Chola territory.

Chola offensive
Rajadhiraja II then responded by sending his commander Thiruchitrambalamudaiyan Perumanambi along with a strong army with specific instructions to kill Lankapura and Jagad Vijaya of the Polonnaruwa Army and hang their heads from the gates of the palace of Madurai. Army of Ceylon (was destroyed) and its generals Lankapura-Dandanayaka and Jagattraya-Dandanayaka put to death, their heads mounted on the gates of Madura, and (thereafter) Kulasekhara was allowed to enter this city (i.e., Madura) (source: Tiruvalangadu Inscription of Rajadhiraja II)after overthrowing the previously installed Vira Pandya, he returned to the Chola country. Kulasekhara was installed as Pandyan king. Cholas promised to protect the Kulasekhara throne.

Following rumours that Parakramabahu was preparing for another invasion, Rajadhiraja II sent a brigade commanded by Annan Pallavarayan to launch a pre-emptive strike. Annan Pallavarayan invaded Polonnaruwa and destroyed Parakramabahu's preparations for the invasion. The Cholas also provided support to Sinhalese Prince Sri Vallabha, nephew of Parakramabahu and a rival claimant to the Polonnaruwa throne. Sri Vallabha decided to stay in the Chola camp, assisting the Cholas.

According to K. A. Sastri Nilakanta, Parakramabahu did a volte-face by sending costly gifts such as jewels and gold to Kulasekhara convincing him to invade the Chola Kingdom. Kulasekhara invaded the Cholas but was defeated and driven out. Chola forces then successfully invaded the Pandya kingdom and reinstalled the Prince Vira Pandya on the throne. However, S. K. Aiyangar notes that Kulasekhara died in the course of the war, and his son Vickrama Pandya kept rebelling against the occupying forces.

Aftermath

Vira Pandya remained a client of the Cholas, however, he decided to grant independence to the Pandya country. His hostilities against the Cholas begun at a time when Kulasekhara's son, Vickrama was rebelling against him. Despite receiving assistance from Parakramabahu, he was defeated and Vickrama ascended the throne. The armies of Parakramabahu controlled Rameshwaram until 1182.

Legacy

Impact
The war led to the weakening of the Chola kingdom, and it completely dissolved before its territory was absorbed into the rival kingdom of Pandya. Polonnaruwa seems to have been unaffected, Parakramabahu in 1181 invaded Burma. Also it's to be noted that the city of Rameshvaram remained under control of Sinhalese armies until the end of the reign of Nissanka Malla.

Second conflict
The death of Jatavarman Pandyan occurred in 1308, a second conflict stemmed from succession disputes amongst his sons, Jatavarman Sundara Pandyan III, the legitimate and younger son and Jatavarman Veera Pandyan II, the illegitimate older son who was favoured by the king. Accounts from Muslim historians Wassaf and Amir Khusrau say he was killed by Jatavarman Sundara Pandyan III in 1310.

See also
Parakrama Pandyan II
Chola conquest of Anuradhapura
Anuradhapura invasion of Pandya
Parakramabahu I#War with Bagan

References

Citations

Bibliography

 

 

 
 
 
 
 
 
 
 

Pandyan Civil War (1169–1177)
Civil wars of the Middle Ages
12th century in India
12th-century conflicts
Pandyan dynasty
1160s conflicts
1170s conflicts
Civil wars involving the states and peoples of Asia
1160s in Asia
1170s in Asia
History of Tamil Nadu
Pandyan Empire
Wars of succession involving the states and peoples of Asia
Wars involving Sri Lanka
Kingdom of Polonnaruwa
Proxy wars
Conflicts in 1173
Conflicts in 1174
Conflicts in 1175
Conflicts in 1176